The 2021 San Diego Toreros football team represented the University of San Diego during the 2021 NCAA Division I FCS football season. They were led by ninth-year head coach Dale Lindsey and played their home games at Torero Stadium. They were a member of the Pioneer Football League (PFL).

Previous season

The Toreros finished the 2020–21 season with a 4–2 overall record and 4–2 in conference record to finish in the third place of the PFL.

Schedule

References

San Diego
San Diego Toreros football seasons
Pioneer Football League champion seasons
San Diego Toreros football